Miniature Pioneering or Model Pioneering is an art form featuring the miniaturized version of pioneering construction. This technique was originally used by Boy Scouts to create a model for campsite planning. Models are a convenient way to plan a construction project, requiring the same techniques as a full-scale model, and allowing for accurate equipment lists to be developed, as well as for difficulties in sequencing construction to be identified. However, scout troops in Malaysia are innovating it into a new form of art through competitions. While real pioneering is a combination of wooden spars and ropes, these materials are replaced by wooden sticks and white thread in Miniature Pioneering. 

Although design and complexity plays a major part in judging the value of a model, lashing quality plays a major role whereby it is evaluated based on the three criteria of tightness, tidiness, and cleanliness. Similar to all handmade models, the activity of making a miniature pioneering model is good training for patience and perfection.

See also
 Scale model

Scoutcraft
Scale modeling